A. T. Karuppiah is an Indian politician and former Member of the Legislative Assembly of Tamil Nadu. He was elected to the Tamil Nadu legislative assembly as a Communist Party of India candidate from Valparai constituency in the 1980 election.

References 

Members of the Tamil Nadu Legislative Assembly
Living people
Communist Party of India politicians from Tamil Nadu
People from Coimbatore district
Year of birth missing (living people)